Konin Żagański  is a village in the administrative district of Gmina Iłowa, within Żagań County, Lubusz Voivodeship, in western Poland.

The village has a population of 760.

History
The name of the village is of Polish origin and comes from the word koń, which means "horse".

In 1939–1940, it was the site of a German Dulag transit prisoner-of-war camp. Its prisoners were mostly Poles captured during the invasion of Poland, which started World War II, but also some Czechs. Following its dissolution the POWs were moved to the Stalag VIII-A and Stalag VIII-C POW camps.

Transport
The A18 motorway runs nearby, south of the village.

References

Villages in Żagań County